John Cummins (born 1948) is an Irish Gaelic football manager and former player as a centre-forward at senior level for the Tipperary county team.

Career
Born in Ardfinnan, County Tipperary, Cummins arrived on the inter-county scene at the age of sixteen when he first linked up with the Tipperary minor team, before later joining the under-21 and junior sides. He made his senior debut in the 1969 championship. Cummins went on to play a key role for almost a decade; however, he experienced little in terms of silverware with Tipp.

At club level Cummins won two championship medal with Ardfinnan.

Cummins retired from inter-county football on following the conclusion of the 1978 championship.

In retirement from playing, Cummins became involved in team management and coaching. He has been a long-serving selector, coach and manager to the Tipperary minor and under-21 football teams.

Cummins's son, Brendan, had a lengthy career as a dual player with Tipperary and is regarded as one of the greatest hurling goalkeepers of all-time.

References

1948 births
Living people
Ardfinnan Gaelic footballers
Gaelic football managers
Tipperary inter-county Gaelic footballers